Cindy is a musical with music and lyrics by Johnny Brandon, and a book by Joe Sauter and Mike Sawyer. It ran Off-Broadway at the Gate, Orpheum, and Cricket Theatres (not simultaneously) in 1964 and 1965. It is an adaptation of the story of Cinderella.  It was produced by Chandler Warren and Philip Temple, by arrangement with Stuart Wiener and Jerry Grace.

Productions 
Cindy opened at the Gate Theatre on March 19, 1964, and closed June 21. On September 24, it reopened at the Orpheum Theatre. It transferred to the Cricket Theatre on January 19, 1965, and closed on May 2, 1965.

Cast and characters

Original cast

Cricket cast replacements 
Cindy Kreller: Isabelle Farrell
Lucky: Tommy Karaty, Rick Landon
Papa: David Howard
Mama: Milly Weitz
Della Kreller: Alice Beardsley
Chuck Rosenfeld: Joe Bellomo
Ruth Rosenfeld: Evelyn Bell, Elizabeth Parrish
Storytellers: Charles Abbate, Michael Loman

Musical numbers 

Act I
"Once Upon a Time" – Storytellers 
"Let's Pretend" – Cindy and Lucky
"Is There Something to What He Said?" – Cindy
"Papa, Let's Do It Again" – Mama, Papa and Storytellers
"A Genuine Feminine Girl" – Cindy
"Cindy" – Lucky
"Think Mink" –  Golda and Della
"A Genuine Feminine Girl" (Reprise) –  Cindy
"Tonight's the Night" – Storytellers
"Who Am I?" –  Cindy and Chuck

Act II
"Act II Opening" – Storytellers
"If You've Got It, You've Got It" – Golda, Della, Mama and Papa
"The Life That I Had Planned for Him" –  Mrs. Rosenfeld
"If It's Love" –  Cindy and Chuck
"Got the World in the Palm of My Hand" –  Chuck
"Call Me Lucky" – Lucky
"Got the World in the Palm of My Hand" (Reprise) –  Storytellers
"Laugh It Up" –  Cindy, Mama, Papa and Boy Storyteller
"Once Upon a Time" (Reprise 1) –  Storytellers
"Let's Pretend" (Reprise) – Cindy and Lucky
"Cindy" (Reprise)/"Who Am I?" (Reprise) – Cindy and Lucky
"What a Wedding" – Mama, Papa, Golda, Della, Mr. Rosenfeld, Mrs. Rosenfeld and Chuck
"Once Upon a Time" (Reprise 2) – Storytellers
"Finale" –  Company

References 

https://web.archive.org/web/20070927210138/http://www.thevillager.com/villager_114/villagarea.html
https://web.archive.org/web/20070917135037/http://www.lortel.org/LLA_archive/index.cfm?search_by=show&id=4147
https://web.archive.org/web/20070917170759/http://www.lortel.org/LLA_archive/index.cfm?search_by=show&id=4059

1964 musicals
Off-Broadway musicals
Works based on Cinderella